Julia Wong Pei Xian (born 12 September 1987) is a badminton player from Malaysia.

Career
Wong was a champion of the women' singles event at the national championships in 2005, 2007 and 2008, also in the doubles event in 2006. In 2006, she won the women's singles title in Sri Lanka Satellite tournament. Wong played the 2007 BWF World Championships in women's singles, and was defeated in the second round by Maria Kristin Yulianti, of Indonesia, 16-21, 21-14, 21-18. In 2008, she played at the Macau Open Badminton Championships in women's singles, and cruised to the final against Zhou Mi but she lost to her 21-13, 21-19. Before that she did beat Wang Lin and Yip Pui Yin.

Achievements

Southeast Asian Games 
Women's singles

BWF Grand Prix 
The BWF Grand Prix has two levels: Grand Prix and Grand Prix Gold. It is a series of badminton tournaments, sanctioned by Badminton World Federation (BWF) since 2007. The World Badminton Grand Prix sanctioned by International Badminton Federation (IBF) since 1983.

Women's singles

 BWF Grand Prix Gold tournament
 BWF & IBF Grand Prix tournament

BWF International Challenge/Series/Satellite
Women's singles

 BWF International Challenge tournament
 BWF International Series & Asian Satellite tournament

References

External links
 BWF Player Profile
 Badminton Malaysia Player Profile

1987 births
Living people
People from Malacca
Malaysian sportspeople of Chinese descent
Malaysian female badminton players
Badminton players at the 2006 Asian Games
Asian Games competitors for Malaysia
Badminton players at the 2006 Commonwealth Games
Commonwealth Games gold medallists for Malaysia
Commonwealth Games medallists in badminton
Competitors at the 2005 Southeast Asian Games
Competitors at the 2007 Southeast Asian Games
Southeast Asian Games bronze medalists for Malaysia
Southeast Asian Games medalists in badminton
Medallists at the 2006 Commonwealth Games